St Lawrence's Church, Dartmouth Street, Duddeston is a former Church of England parish church in Birmingham.

History

The foundation stone was laid on 20 June 1867 by the Bishop of Worcester.

The funding of the church was provided by Miss Louisa Ann Ryland. The church was designed by J A Chatwin and built in brick, with the tracery of the windows in Corsham Down Bath stone. The contractor was Charles Jones of Belmont Row, Birmingham. It was consecrated on 25 June 1868 by the Bishop of Worcester. A parish was assigned out of St Matthew's Church, Duddeston and Nechells in 1868.

Alterations were undertaken in 1894 and 1895.

The church was closed in 1951 and the parish was reunited with St Matthew's Church, Duddeston and Nechells.

Organ

An organ by Halmshaw was installed. A specification of the organ can be found on the National Pipe Organ Register.

References

Church of England church buildings in Birmingham, West Midlands
Churches completed in 1868